Sculcoates is a suburb of Kingston upon Hull, north of the city centre, in the East Riding of Yorkshire, England. 

For many centuries, much of what was called Hull came within the parish of St Mary's Church.

Sculcoates railway station closed on 9 June 1912.

Amenities 
Sculcoates has a library, a post office, a high school, two primary schools and a swimming bath called Beverley Road Baths. The baths was opened in 1905, and underwent a £3.75 million refurbishment from June 2020 until reopening in August 2021. The baths are a Grade II Listed building.

Notable people
 Dorothy Mackaill – actress (1903–1990)

See also 
 Sculcoates Rural District
 Sculcoates railway station

References

Further reading

External links

 
Wards and districts of Kingston upon Hull